Nélson Alexandre Vieira Semedo (born 25 November 1987 in Lisbon), known as Adilson, is a Portuguese professional footballer who plays for C.D. Pinhalnovense as a winger.

External links

1987 births
Living people
Footballers from Lisbon
Portuguese footballers
Association football wingers
Primeira Liga players
Liga Portugal 2 players
Atlético Clube de Portugal players
C.F. União players
C.F. Os Belenenses players
S.C. Olhanense players
Varzim S.C. players
C.D. Cova da Piedade players
GS Loures players
C.D. Pinhalnovense players